Gabriella Lantos (born 24 September 1970) is a Hungarian fencer. She competed in the foil events at the 1992, 1996 and 2000 Summer Olympics.

References

External links
 

1970 births
Living people
Hungarian female foil fencers
Olympic fencers of Hungary
Fencers at the 1992 Summer Olympics
Fencers at the 1996 Summer Olympics
Fencers at the 2000 Summer Olympics
Martial artists from Budapest
20th-century Hungarian women